Joseph Bradford may refer to:
 Joseph Bradford (playwright) (1843–1886), American playwright
 Joseph Bradford (preacher) (died 1808), British preacher, companion of John Wesley
 Joseph H. Bradford, teacher, lawyer, and state legislator in Arkansas
 Joe Bradford (1901–1980), English footballer
 Joseph Bradford, winner of the 1978 U.S. Open Chess Championship

See also